No Rules is a 2005 action film directed by Gerry Anderson. Produced by Romeo Antonio, it follows a small-town man, haunted by his parents murder, who wants to become a mixed martial artist.

Cast
David Dunn as Kurt Diamond
Randy Couture as Mason
Tom Sizemore as Kain Diamond
Gary Busey as Leroy Little
Pamela Anderson as herself
Bruce Buffer as himself
Romeo Antonio as drug dealer
Matt Mullins as Brotherhood Fighter

External links

2005 action films
2005 films
Cultural depictions of Pamela Anderson
2005 martial arts films
Mixed martial arts films
2000s English-language films